William A. Drake (December 9, 1899 – October 28, 1965), was an American screenwriter. He wrote 7 films between 1932 and 1939.  His best-known work is the 1932 film Grand Hotel, which won the Academy Award for Best Picture.

He was born William Absalom Drake in Dayton, Montgomery, Ohio, United States and died in Los Angeles, California.

External links

1899 births
1965 deaths
American male screenwriters
20th-century American male writers
20th-century American screenwriters